Gibberd Garden is a garden in Harlow, Essex, England, which was created by Sir Frederick Gibberd (the planner of Harlow New Town) and his wife Patricia Gibberd. They designed the garden and added sculptures, ceramic pots and architectural salvage from 1972 till his death in 1984.

External links

 The Gibberd Garden, Harlow
 

Gardens in Essex
Harlow